Albania–Kosovo relations refer to the current, cultural and historical relations of Albania and Kosovo. Albania has an embassy in Pristina and Kosovo has an embassy in Tirana. There are 1.8 million Albanians living in Kosovo – officially 92.93% of Kosovo's entire population – and Albanian is an official language and the national language of Kosovo. Likewise, the peoples of the two countries have practically identical traditions and folklore. Kosovo is the birthplace of Albanian nationalism such as the League of Prizren. In addition, the strong relations are highlighted in successive polls showing majority of ethnic Albanians in both states wanting unification. Both countries and their citizens refer to the relationship as "one nation, two states" as highlighted in the popular pan-Albanian slogan "jemi nje"(we are one).

As a full member of the North Atlantic Treaty Organization (NATO), Albania supports Kosovo in its NATO-integration path.

History

Early history

Modern 

On 22 October 1991, Albania was the only country whose parliament voted to recognise the Republic of Kosova, which had been proclaimed independent in 1991. Official support was limited to the declaration. In 1994, when the Bosnian conflict escalated, Albania made a step back by recognising Yugoslavia's borders, which included Kosovo.

Independence 

When Kosovo declared its independence from Serbia on 17 February 2008, Albania became one of the first countries to officially announce its recognition of the Republic of Kosovo. Diplomatic relations were established the following day.

On 18 August 2009, Prime Minister Sali Berisha of Albania was quoted as saying, "There should be no customs administration between the two countries. We should by no means allow Albania and Kosovo to view each other as foreign countries". This comment outraged Serbia.

The Albanian Foreign Ministry, in a clarification note to Serbia, said: "Albania considers the independent state of Kosovo as a factor of peace and stability in the Balkan region, whereas its independence is considered as a clear step serving people, stability and European perspective of the region". It also said that the foreign policy of the Republic of Albania "is based on common objectives of Euro-Atlantic integration of the country, Republic of Kosovo and entire region".

2019 Albania earthquake 
On 26 November 2019, an earthquake struck Albania. €500,000 were sent by the government of Kosovo and over €3,500,000 were sent by the Kosovar population. 110 specialised operators of the Kosovo Police were dispatched, as were 40 members of the Kosovo Security Force's Urban Search and Rescue Units. President Hashim Thaçi was part of a presidential delegation that visited the earthquake epicentre and expressed his condolences on behalf of Kosovo. On Friday, outgoing Kosovo Prime Minister Ramush Haradinaj and his possible successor Albin Kurti visited Durrës to survey the damage and expressed Kosovan commitment to relief efforts and the need for institutional cooperation between both countries. Displaced people have been relocated to Kosovo with 500 residing in a camp in Prizren established by the Kosovo government.

The Kosovo Albanian population reacted with sentiments of solidarity through fundraising initiatives and money, food, clothing and shelter donations. Volunteers and humanitarian aid in trucks, buses and hundreds of cars from Kosovo traveled to Albania to assist in the situation and people were involved in tasks such as the operation of mobile kitchens and gathering financial aid. Many Albanians in Kosovo have opened their homes to people displaced by the earthquake.

Relations

Cultural 

In October 2011, an agreement was reached between the Ministry of Culture of Kosovo and that of Albania on the common use of embassies and consular services, and in May 2012, a common primer for the 2012–13 academic year of first class students was approved by both governments.

Economic 
The Albanian Konfindustria threw first the idea of an Albanian regional market in 2008, and the idea about a common economic space between Albania and Kosovo was discussed by Kosovo government officials in 2011.

They were reinforced especially by Behgjet Pacolli in some of his speeches in Albania: he claimed that the economic union would increase competition towards the EU. Pacolli's ideas were endorsed by the Party for Justice, Integration and Unity.

See also 
 Foreign relations of Albania
 Foreign relations of Kosovo
 Albania–Serbia relations 
 Unification of Albania and Kosovo 
 Kosovo Albanians
 Albania–Yugoslavia relations

Notes

References

External links 
 Albanian Ministry of Foreign Affairs

 
Bilateral relations of Kosovo
Kosovo